South Beauregard High School is a middle and high school in Longville, Louisiana. It is a part of Beauregard Parish Schools.

History
Joey Bartz became the principal of South Beauregard High School  for the  2017–18 school year, after his predecessor, Tammy Crain, moved into the district office as an instructional supervisor. As of 2019, South Beauregard High School has been ranked as one of the highest rated public high schools in the state of Louisiana.

Athletics
Beauregard High athletics competes in the LHSAA.

References

External links
 South Beauregard High School

Public high schools in Louisiana
Public middle schools in Louisiana
Education in Beauregard Parish, Louisiana